Two ships of the Royal Navy have been named HMS Cyclamen :

  an  sloop launched in 1916 and sold in 1932
 , a  launched in 1940 and sold into mercantile service as Southern Briar in 1947. She was wrecked in 1966 en-route for scrapping

Royal Navy ship names